Return of the Lost Tribe is an album by Bright Moments, a collaborative project by saxophonists Joseph Jarman and Kalaparusha Maurice McIntyre, percussionist Kahil El'Zabar, bassist Malachi Favors and pianist Adegoke Steve Colson, which was recorded in 1997 and released on the Delmark label.

Reception

In his review for AllMusic, Michael G. Nastos stated: "This is a landmark recording for these five individuals who come together in so many real and important musical ways. It is, for listeners of this type of improvised music, a definitive recording, and one of the best of 1998".

Writing for Jazz Times, Tom Terrell commented: "these jazz griots have come up with some of the best music of their lives. ROTLT's seven tracks are overflowing with evocative moments... and improvisational epiphanies... This is no last hurrah; this is a new day."

The Washington Post's Christopher Porter noted that "Bright Moments is dedicated to recapturing the original spirit and energy of the AACM--before its members are too old to do so," and wrote: "While nothing on Return of the Lost Tribe recasts the sonic density of early AACM recordings... Bright Moments is a glistening reminder of their blazing spirit."

Track listing
 "Return of the Lost Tribe" (Kahil El'Zabar) – 10:09
 "Song of Joy for the Predestined" (Joseph Jarman) – 8:06
 "Kudus" (Jarman) – 8:37
 "Dance'm" (El'Zabar) – 8:25
 "Fragmentation - Prayer at Twilight" (Adegoke Steve Colson) – 8:02
 "Ornette" (El'Zabar) – 8:00
 "Dream of" (Kalaparusha Maurice McIntyre) – 9:37

Personnel
Joseph Jarman – flute, alto saxophone, recitation
Kalaparusha Maurice McIntyre – tenor saxophone
Adegoke Steve Colson – piano
Malachi Favors – bass
Kahil El'Zabar – drums, percussion, voice

References

1998 albums
Joseph Jarman albums
Kalaparusha Maurice McIntyre albums
Kahil El'Zabar albums
Albums produced by Bob Koester
Delmark Records albums